The Oberliga Niederrhein is a German amateur football division administered by the Football Association of the Lower Rhine, one of the 21 German state football associations. Being the top flight of the Lower Rhine state association, the Oberliga is currently a level 5 division of the German football league system.

History
Until 1956, a total of ten Landesliga divisions, among them three divisions of Landesliga Niederrhein were the highest amateur level in the state of North Rhine-Westphalia. After the regular season, the ten Landesliga champions had to play-off for two promotion spots to 2. Oberliga West. Upon decision of the superior Western German football association, in 1956 four divisions of Verbandsliga were introduced, one of them being the Verbandsliga Niederrhein. These four divisions of Verbandsliga still exist today, with the Verbandsliga Niederrhein in 2008 renamed to Niederrheinliga and later in 2012 renamed to Oberliga Niederrhein.

The Verbandsliga Niederrhein was upon its inception the third tier of the German football league system. The league champion had to play-off the winners of the Verbandsliga Mittelrhein and the two divisions of Verbandsliga Westfalen for two promotion spots to the 2nd Oberliga West. Upon introduction of the Bundesliga in 1963, the league was set below the new Regionalliga West but remained as the third tier. With the exception of 1963 and 1974, when the league systems were changed, the champion continued to have the opportunity to win promotion. In 1964, 1970, 1976 and 1978, the league winner failed to do so; in every other season they were successful. In 1977, the runner-up was promoted as Fortuna Düsseldorf II was ineligible.

The league operated with 16 clubs throughout most of its existence, only occasionally altering the numbers to balance out promotion and relegation.

With the replacement of the Regionalliga by the 2nd Bundesliga Nord in 1974, the league champion had to gain promotion through a play-off system with the winners of the other tier-three leagues in northern Germany.

In 1978, the Amateur-Oberliga Nordrhein was formed as the third tier of football in the region compromising the area of the Verbandsliga Niederrhein and Verbandsliga Mittelrhein. One of the main reasons for this move was to provide direct promotion for the tier-three champions again. The clubs placed one to seven in the league were admitted to the new Oberliga, these being:

 Olympia Bocholt
 Rot-Weiß Oberhausen
 VfB Remscheid
 TuS Xanten
 1. FC Viersen
 ASV Wuppertal
 RSV Meerbeck

Verbandsliga Niederrhein, together with Mittelrhein, remained as a feeder league for the new Oberliga, but now as a tier-four competition. Its champion, and in some years the runners-up, were directly promoted to the Oberliga Nordrhein.

With the re-introduction of the Regionalligen in 1994, the league slipped to tier five but remained unchanged otherwise.

From 2008, with the introduction of the 3rd Liga, the Verbandsliga Niederrhein was downgraded to the sixth tier. The league above it was then the new NRW-Liga, a merger of the Oberligen Nordrhein and Westfalen. The champion of the Verbandsliga continued to be directly promoted but since there were now four Verbandsligen below the Oberliga, the runners-up did not have the option of promotion unless the league winner declined.

The NRW-Liga existed for only for seasons before it was disbanded again in the wake of the Regionalliga West becoming a league for clubs from North Rhine-Westphalia only. While the Oberliga Westfalen was established again in one half of the state the regions of Lower Rhine and Middle Rhine opted to elevate the Niederrheinliga and Mittelrheinliga to Oberliga status instead of reforming the Oberliga Nordrhein.

League champions

Source:

Union Solingen holds the record number of titles in the league with four.
 The 2013–14 champions SV Hönnepel-Niedermörmter declined promotion; FC Kray were promoted instead.
 The 2020–21 season was curtailed owing to the COVID-19 pandemic in Germany. There was no champion or promotion.

Clubs in the Oberliga Niederrhein since 2012
The final league placings of all clubs in the league since receiving Oberliga status in 2012:

Key

Founding members of the league
From the Landesliga Gruppe 1:
 TSV Eller 04
 VfL Benrath
 Grün-Weiß Viersen
 SpVgg Gräfrath
 TuRU Düsseldorf

From the Landesliga Gruppe 2:
 FV Duisburg 08
 TuS Lintfort
 SpVgg Hochheide
 Homberger SV
 SC Kleve

From the Landesliga Gruppe 3:
 TuS Duisburg 48/99
 Sterkrade 06/07
 BV Osterfeld
 1. FC Mülheim-Styrum
 SV Borbeck
 TSG Karnap

References

Sources
 Deutschlands Fußball in Zahlen,  An annual publication with tables and results from the Bundesliga to Verbandsliga/Landesliga. DSFS.
 Kicker Almanach,  The yearbook on German football from Bundesliga to Oberliga, since 1937. Kicker Sports Magazine.
 Die Deutsche Liga-Chronik 1945–2005  History of German football from 1945 to 2005 in tables. DSFS. 2006.

External links 
 Das deutsche Fußball-Archiv Historic German league tables 
 Niederrhein Football Association (FVN) 

 
Oberliga (football)
Football competitions in North Rhine-Westphalia
1956 establishments in Germany